Fires of Winter is a novel by Johanna Lindsey originally published in September 1980 by Avon Books. It is the first book in the Haardrad Family Saga Series.

Plot: The Viking invaders came from across an icy sea, taking lady Brenna as their captive. But the dauntless Celtic beauty swears that no barbarian will ever be her master—not even the handsome and powerful brute Garrick Haardrad.

The son of a ruthless Viking chieftain, Garrick is accustomed to getting his way, as he claims his exquisite "prize" with a primitive abandon that leaves Brenna breathless. Yet it is Garrick's gentle soul that undoes the lady's resolve. For even as she plots the vengeance she vowed, Brenna cannot ignore the wonder of his kisses—or douse the flames of a newly lit passion that blazes like starfire through the cold Nordic nights.

1980 American novels
Historical romance novels
Novels set in the Viking Age
Fiction set in the 9th century
Avon (publisher) books
American romance novels